The 2014–15 Saint Louis Billikens men's basketball team represented Saint Louis University in the 2014–15 NCAA Division I men's basketball season. The Billikens were led by their head coach Jim Crews who served his second season at Saint Louis. The team played their home games at Chaifetz Arena. They were a member of the Atlantic 10 Conference. The Bilikens proceeded to complete their best to worst season.

The season was the 100th in Saint Louis men's basketball history.

Previous season 
The Billikens finished the season with an overall record of 27–7, with a record of 13–3 in the Atlantic 10 regular season to win the regular season conference championship. In the 2014 Atlantic 10 tournament, the Billikens lost to St. Bonaventure in the quarterfinals. They received an at-large bid to the NCAA tournament where they defeated NC State in the second round before losing in the third round to Louisville.

Off season

Departures

Incoming recruits

Roster

100 Years celebration
SLU celebrated the 100th season of Billiken basketball by announced their All-Century team.  The team would be honored at halftime of their February 22 game against La Salle:

Players:
Anthony Bonner (1986–1990)
Dick Boushka (1951–1954)
Erwin Claggett (1991–1995)
Monroe Douglass (1985–1989)
Dwayne Evans (2010–2014)
Bob Ferry (1956–1959)
Roland Gray (1985–1989)
Scott Highmark (1991–1995)
Larry Hughes (1997–1998)
Jordair Jett (2010–2014)
Kevin Lisch (2005–2009)
Ed Macauley (1945–1949)
Dan Miller (1945–1948)
Jack Mimlitz (1955–1958)
Kwamain Mitchell (2008–2013)
Joe Wiley (1967–1970)

Coaches:
Eddie Hickey (1947–1958)
Rick Majerus (2007–2012)
Charlie Spoonhour (1992–1999)

Schedule

|-
!colspan=9 style="background:#0000CC; color:#FFFFFF;"| Exhibition

|-
!colspan=9 style="background:#0000CC; color:#FFFFFF;"| Non-conference regular season

|-
!colspan=9 style="background:#0000CC; color:#FFFFFF;"| Atlantic 10 regular season

|-
!colspan=9 style="background:#0000CC; color:#FFFFFF;"| Atlantic 10 tournament

References

Saint Louis
Saint Louis Billikens men's basketball seasons
Saint
Saint